Agustín Da Silveira Muñoa (born 11 December 2000) is a Uruguayan professional footballer who plays as a centre-back for Peñarol.

Career
Da Silveira joined the Peñarol youth academy in 2016, beginning with the club's under-16 squad. He made his professional debut on 6 August 2021 in a 1–0 league win over Cerro Largo.

Career statistics

Honours
Peñarol
 Uruguayan Primera División: 2021

References

External links
Agustín da Silveira at Peñarol

2000 births
Living people
Peñarol players
Uruguayan Primera División players
Uruguayan footballers
Association football defenders
People from Artigas, Uruguay
Uruguayan people of Portuguese descent